Poa litorosa is a species of tussock grass that is native to the subantarctic islands of New Zealand and Australia. The specific epithet litorosa comes from the Latin litoralis (“pertaining to the seashore”).

Description
Poa litorosa is a perennial grass, growing in straw-coloured, wiry tussocks up to 60 cm in height. It is closely related to Poa cita (silver tussock) of New Zealand and is native to New Zealand's Antipodes, Auckland and Campbell Islands as well as to Australia's Macquarie Island.

References

litorosa
Flora of the Antipodes Islands
Flora of the Auckland Islands
Flora of the Campbell Islands
Flora of Macquarie Island
Grasses of New Zealand
Poales of Australia
Plants described in 1906
Taxa named by Thomas Frederic Cheeseman